Punto de Vista is the fifth studio album recorded by Puerto Rican salsa singer Gilberto Santa Rosa released on August 10, 1990. It was nominated for Tropical/Salsa Album of the Year at the 1991 Lo Nuestro Awards.

Track listing
This information adapted from Allmusic.

Chart performance

Certification

References

1990 albums
Gilberto Santa Rosa albums
Sony Discos albums